Rasmus Andre Sivertsen (26 September 1972, Inderøy) is a Norwegian film director, editor, producer, animator and former television director. He is a co-owner of film production company Qvisten Animation.

Life and career 
Rasmus Andre Sivertsen was born on 26 September 1972 in Inderøy, Trøndelag, Norway. He studied animation at Volda University College in Møre og Romsdal and graduated in 1995. He made his directorial debut in 2001 with the short film Guggen - The Big Cheese, and made his feature film directorial debut as a co-director of Captain Sabertooth (2003), based on the titular franchise. In 2008, he directed Kurt turns Evil for Qvisten Animation, and later directed two films based on the Pelle Politibil children's character, known as Ploddy in English dubbed media: Ploddy the Police Car Makes a Splash (2009) and Ploddy the Police Car on the Case (2013). In Norway, the films grossed $1,524,396 from 120,816 admissions and $2,102,960 from 158,029 admissions respectively.

Sivertsen directed a trilogy of films based on the characters from Kjell Aukrust's Flåklypa universe, with Solan and Ludvig (named Louis and Luca in English dubbed media) being the principal focus of the films. The first film, Solan and Ludvig: Christmas in Pinchcliffe, was released in 2013 and grossed $12,313,639 internationally. The second film Louis and Luca – The Big Cheese Race, was released in 2015, and received 241,472 admissions in Norwegian cinemas. The final film Louis & Luca - Mission to the Moon, was released in 2018, and grossed $4,838,873 from 422,796 admissions, making it the second highest-grossing film in Norway of that year. All three films received positive reviews, with praise particularly aimed at the films' humour and animation, but with criticisms focused on their conventionality.

Filmography

Feature films

Television shows

Additional 
Fanthomas, director for 2D cartoon comedy series

References

External links 

Rasmus A. Sivertsen at Rotten Tomatoes
Rasmus A. Sivertsen at the Danish Film Institute (in Danish)
Rasmus A. Sivertsen at Cineuropa

Norwegian animators
Norwegian film directors
Norwegian film editors
1972 births
Living people